Evans Hall is a common name for buildings on college and university campuses.  Colleges which have (or had) an Evans Hall include:
 Agnes Scott College
 Becker College
 Berry College
 Carleton College
 Connecticut College
 Emory University
 Florida Institute of Technology
 Gordon College (Massachusetts)
 Henderson State University
 Indiana Wesleyan University
 Loma Linda University
 Mississippi State University (dormitory, 1964–2014)
 Ohio State University
 Philadelphia College of Osteopathic Medicine
 Point Loma Nazarene University
 Prairie View A&M University
 Ripon College
 Simmons College
 Southwestern Adventist University
 Sterling College
 University of Central Oklahoma
 University of Delaware
 University of California, Berkeley
 University of Illinois at Urbana–Champaign
 University of Oklahoma
 University of Wisconsin–Oshkosh
 Wilkes University

Architectural disambiguation pages